The International Conference on Software Reuse (ICSR), is the primary scientific conference on software reuse, domain analysis, and domain engineering.

ICSR includes software  reuse researchers, practitioners, and managers. The conference provides an archival source for important reuse papers. The conference is also meant to provide reuse information and education to practitioners, and to be an  ongoing platform for technology transfer.

Software reusability, the use of knowledge or artifacts from existing systems to build new ones, is a key software engineering technology important both to engineers and managers. Reuse research has been very  active. Many organizations have reported reuse successes, yet there are still important research issues in  systematic reuse. There is a need for reuse solutions that can be applied across domain and organization boundaries. The conference consists of technical presentations, parallel working groups, plenary sessions, demonstrations, and tutorials.

Topics include  reuse metrics, case studies and experiments, copyright and legal issues, current issues in reuse libraries, distributed components, formal methods, design and validation of components, domain analysis and engineering, generators, and Integration frameworks.

List of conferences:

References

External links
 
 ReNews

Software engineering conferences
Reuse